Big Brother 2023, also known as Big Brother 20, is the upcoming twentieth series of Big Brother. It will be the first series to air on ITV2 after ITV gained the rights to the series in August 2022, almost four years since it last aired on Channel 5.

Production
In April 2022, it was reported in several tabloid newspapers that ITV Studios were in talks with production company Banijay, who own the rights to Big Brother, to revive the series in 2023, following a five-year hiatus. On 1 August 2022, during the final of the eighth series of Love Island, a 20-second teaser trailer aired on ITV2, with ITV subsequently confirming that the show would return for a new series in 2023.

Following the announcement of the series, Paul Mortimer, the director of Reality Commissioning & Acquisitions said: "This refreshed, contemporary new series of Big Brother will contain all the familiar format points that kept viewers engaged and entertained the first time round [...] We’re beyond excited to bring this iconic series to ITV2 and ITVX where it should especially engage with our younger viewers."

Emma Willis, the presenter of the programme prior to its cancellation on Channel 5, ruled out the possibility of her returning as host saying that she "loved [her] time on the show" but "very much kind of said goodbye to it back then because [she] thought it was over".

Despite not being confirmed, Marcus Bentley, the off-screen narrator of the show since its beginning on Channel 4, is expected to return to narrate the new series, stating in news reports that he had been having calls, updates and discussions with producers.

Applications opened online on 10 October 2022 and were initially set to close on 27 January 2023, but have now been extended to 30 June 2023.

Format
Following the commissioning of the show, ITV announced that the series would feature a new cast of carefully selected housemates, from all walks of life. The series is set to run for up to six weeks, with "cameras capturing [the housemates'] every move, and the nation following every twist and turn." Shopping tasks, nominations and live evictions will return, with the public once again voting throughout the series and ultimately determining the winner, who will walk away with a cash prize.

The programme is set to run for 36 episodes, airing 6 nights a week (Sunday to Friday). There will be a 90-minute launch and finale episode.

Kevin Lygo, Director of Television at ITV, speaking to the Broadcasting Press Guild said he wishes to convince Marcus Bentley to narrate the upcoming series.

House
The location for the series was not initially confirmed, but it was teased as "an iconic Big Brother house" which would be given "its own contemporary new look ready for this reimagining of the show." A week after the announcement of the series returning, media outlets reported that the series is set to be filmed at ITV Studios Bovingdon after planning applications were submitted for three new studios, as well as a backlot for temporary studios with outdoor filming.

Eye logo
During the 20-second teaser, it depicted numerous ITV2 logos forming into the shape of a Big Brother eye.

References

External links
 

Upcoming television seasons
20
ITV reality television shows